The men's 800 metres event at the 2007 European Athletics U23 Championships was held in Debrecen, Hungary, at Gyulai István Atlétikai Stadion on 12 and 14 July.

Medalists

Results

Final
14 July

Heats
12 July
Qualified: first 2 in each heat and 2 best to the Final

Heat 1

Heat 2

†:  Graeme Oudney qualified for the final by decision of the Jury of Appeal (IAAF Rule 163.2)

Heat 3

Participation
According to an unofficial count, 23 athletes from 17 countries participated in the event.

 (1)
 (1)
 (3)
 (2)
 (2)
 (1)
 (1)
 (1)
 (1)
 (1)
 (1)
 (1)
 (1)
 (1)
 (1)
 (1)
 (3)

References

800 metres
800 metres at the European Athletics U23 Championships